{{Infobox national football team 
| Name                  = Qatar Under-23
| Badge                 =
| Nickname              = Annabi'' (The Maroon) 
| Association           = Qatar Football Association
| Sub-confederation     = WAFF (West Asia)
| Confederation         = AFC (Asia)
| FIFA Trigramme        = QAT 
| Coach                 =  Nicolás Córdova
| Assistant manager     = 
| Captain               =
| Most caps             =
| Top scorer            =
| Home Stadium          = Khalifa International StadiumJassim bin Hamad Stadium
| pattern_la1 = 
| pattern_b1  = _qat18h
| pattern_ra1 = 
| pattern_sh1 = 
| pattern_so1 = _qat18H
| leftarm1    = 910000
| body1       = 910000
| rightarm1   = 910000
| shorts1     = 910000
| socks1      = 910000
|pattern_la2         = _qat19a
| pattern_b2         = _qat19a
| pattern_ra2        = _qat19a
| pattern_sh2        = 
| pattern_so2        = _qat19a
| leftarm2           = FFFFFF
| body2              = FFFFFF
| rightarm2          = FFFFFF
| shorts2            = FFFFFF
| socks2             = FFFFFF
| First game            = 
| Largest win           = 
| Largest loss          =
| Most Recent match     =
| World cup apps        =
| World cup first       =
| World cup best        =
| Regional name         = Olympics 
| Regional cup apps     = 2
| Regional cup first    = 1984 
| Regional cup best     = Quarter-finals: 1992
| 2ndRegional name      = AFC U-23 Championship
| 2ndRegional cup apps  = 4
| 2ndRegional cup first = 2016
| 2ndRegional cup best  =  Bronze Medal (2018)
| 3rdRegional name      = Asian Games
| 3rdRegional cup apps  = 3
| 3rdRegional cup first = 2002
| 3rdRegional cup best  =  Gold Medal (2006)
}}

Qatar national under-23 football team (also known as Qatar Under-23 or Qatar Olympics Team) represents Qatar in international football competitions in GCC U-23 Championship and Football at the Summer Olympics, as well as any other under-23 international football tournaments.

History 
Compared to regional neighbours; Qatar has a decent record to show for in Olympic football, with two prior Summer Olympics qualifications and a gold medal in the 2006 Asian games.

Qatar's first attempt to compete in the Olympic level proved fruitful, they cruised past Jordan and Syria in the preliminary stages of the 1984 Los Angeles Olympics, then finished atop of Group B in the final qualifications round after beating Thailand, Malaysia, Japan and Iraq.

Qatar's Olympic debut under Brazilian legend Evaristo de Macedo came as stunning as it gets, a 2–2 draw with a Platini captained France (who went on to claim the gold medal eventually), sent ripples of shock across the football world, however; suffering two defeats to Chile and Norway deprived the first timers of a last 16 berth.

Eight years later, a new young squad dominated its qualifying campaign on the expense of Japan, China and Saudi Arabia, in the finals; the Qataris were given a tough draw next to host nation Spain, Colombia and Egypt. Qatar kicked off their matches at Barcelona with a crucial 1–0 win over fellow Arab nation Egypt, before registering a 1–1 draw with Colombia to secure a place in the knockout stage, turning the last group match against Spain into a formality.

A loss to Poland in the second stage fell a little bit short of rising expectations, but reaching the second stage led to the country's best Olympic result.

When hosting the 2006 Asian Games, Qatar found itself with a double objective; to show that it was capable of hosting a major event of that caliber, and demonstrate that its football team was worthy of standing alongside Asia's elite.

Undefeated throughout the whole tournament; Qatar's momentum escalated from one match to another, reaching its peak in the 2–0 final against Iraq.

Tournament records

Summer Olympics 
Since 1992, football at the Summer Olympics changes into Under-23 tournament.

U-23 Asian Cup

Asian Games 
Since 2002, football at the Asian Games changes into Under-23 tournament.

GCC U-23 Championship

Recent results and fixtures

2022

Coaching staff

Players

Current squad 
 The following players were called up for the 2022 WAFF U-23 Championship.
 Match dates: 2 – 15 November 2022Caps and goals correct as of:''' 3 November 2022, after the match against

Previous squads 

Olympic Games
 1992 Summer Olympics squads – Qatar

AFC U-23 Championship
 2016 AFC U-23 Championship
 2018 AFC U-23 Championship

Managers

See also 
 Qatar national football team
 Qatar national under-20 football team
 Qatar national under-17 football team

References 

National youth sports teams of Qatar
Asian national under-23 association football teams